The men's 100 metre freestyle event at the 1964 Olympic Games took place between October 11 and 12. There were 66 competitors from 33 nations. Nations were again able to bring up to three swimmers each after a one-Games limit of two in 1960. The event was won by Don Schollander of the United States, the nation's first victory in the event since 1952 and eighth overall (most of any nation). Great Britain (Bobby McGregor's silver) and the United Team of Germany (Hans-Joachim Klein's bronze) both earned their first medal in the men's 100 metre freestyle.

Background

This was the 14th appearance of the men's 100 metre freestyle. The event has been held at every Summer Olympics except 1900 (when the shortest freestyle was the 200 metres), though the 1904 version was measured in yards rather than metres.

Two of the eight finalists from the 1960 Games returned: fifth-place finisher Gyula Dobay of Hungary and eighth-place finisher Per-Ola Lindberg of Sweden. John Devitt of Australia, the winner of a controversial finish in 1960, had retired, as had silver medalist Lance Larson of the United States. The American team in Tokyo was led by Don Schollander, who was expected to vie with Scotsman Bobby McGregor.

Iran, Puerto Rico, South Korea, and Thailand each made their debut in the event. The United States made its 14th appearance, having competed at each edition of the event to date.

Competition format

The competition used a three-round (heats, semifinals, final) format. The advancement rule followed the format introduced in 1952. A swimmer's place in the heat was not used to determine advancement; instead, the fastest times from across all heats in a round were used. There were 9 heats of 7 or 8 swimmers each. The top 24 swimmers advanced to the semifinals. There were 3 semifinals of 8 swimmers each. The top 8 swimmers advanced to the final. Swim-offs were used as necessary to break ties.

This swimming event used freestyle swimming, which means that the method of the stroke is not regulated (unlike backstroke, breaststroke, and butterfly events). Nearly all swimmers use the front crawl or a variant of that stroke. Because an Olympic size swimming pool is 50 metres long, this race consisted of two lengths of the pool.

Records

These were the standing world and Olympic records (in seconds) prior to the 1964 Summer Olympics.

Gary Ilman dropped more than a second off the Olympic record in the very first heat, recording a time of 54.0 seconds. Seven swimmers beat the old record in the heats, with two more tying it. Ilman shaved off another tenth in the first semifinal, finishing in 53.9 seconds. Ten swimmers beat the old record in that round, with another matching it. The new record fell again in the final, with Don Schollander swimming 53.4 seconds and Bobby McGregor 53.5 seconds.

Schedule

Results

Heats

Nine heats were held; the fastest 24 swimmers advanced to the semifinals.

Semifinals

Three heats were held; the fastest eight swimmers advanced to the final.

Final

The officials used unofficial electronic scoring to determine which swimmer won the bronze medal - Klein had finished one one-thousandth of a second sooner than Ilman.

References

Men's freestyle 100 metre
Men's events at the 1964 Summer Olympics